Antonina Nikolayevna Shuranova (1936–2003) was a Russian stage, television and film actress.

Partial filmography
 War and Peace (1966–1967, part 1-5) as Princess Maria Bolkonskaya
 On the Way to Berlin (1969) as Tatyana Mikhaylovna
 Tchaikovsky (1970) as Nadezhda von Meck
 Matters of the Heart (1974) as Lida
 Strange Adults (1974, TV Movie) as Nina Ivanovna
 Trust (1976) as Rosa Luxemburg
 An Unfinished Piece for Mechanical Piano (1977) as Anna Petrovna Voynitseva
 Strict Male Life (1977) as Tamara Stepanovna Klyonova
 Engineer Graftio (1979) as Antonina Graftio
 Since We Are Together (1983) as Antonina Petrovna
 Everyone Loves Someone (1988) as Klavdiya Ivanovna
 Do You Remember the Smell of Lilac... (1992) as Vera Lvovna
 June 22, at Exactly 4 am... (1992) as Tanya's mother
 Streets of Broken Lights (1998) as Maria Pavlovna Leonidova

Awards
Honored Artist of the RSFSR (January 30, 1974)
People's Artist of the RSFSR (August 20, 1980)

References

Bibliography 
 Rollberg, Peter. Historical Dictionary of Russian and Soviet Cinema. Scarecrow Press, 2008.

External links 
 

1936 births
2003 deaths
Soviet stage actresses
Soviet film actresses
Soviet television actresses
Russian stage actresses
Russian film actresses
Russian television actresses
People from Sevastopol
Honored Artists of the RSFSR
People's Artists of the RSFSR
Russian State Institute of Performing Arts alumni
Communist Party of the Soviet Union members
Burials at Serafimovskoe Cemetery
20th-century Russian women